Ratnu (IAST: Ratanūṃ; Devnagari: रतनूं), also spelt as Ratanu or Ratnoo, is a major clan of the Charanas in Rajasthan and Gujarat.

Origin 
The origin of the Ratnu Charanas is considered to be in the same time period as that of Sindhaych Charanas, around 8th to 9th century CE. They are the descendants of Ratanji Charan who once saved Rawal Devraj's life, a Bhati chieftain who later founded Derawar. After founding Derawar, Rawal Devraj called upon his childhood friend Ratanji and honored him with the position of Prolpat-Patvi of the Bhati dynasty. Subsequently, Ratnu Charanas held this position in the kingdoms of Jaisalmer and Pugal.

History 
Ratnus played an important role in the administration and polity of the region and held extensive sasan jagirs throughout Rajasthan. Many were influential poets, writers, and historians. The Ratnu family of Sikar formed one such bureaucratic lineage whose members were Diwans (Prime Minister) of the princely states of Sikar, Idar, Kishengarh, and Jhalawad.

Notable people 

 Thakur Akshay Singh Ratnu

References 

Charan clans
Charan
Indian surnames
Ethnic groups in India